Tevin Wilford Gamboa (born 22 January 1994) is a Belizean footballer who plays for Belize Defence Force FC and the Belize national football team.

References

External links

1994 births
Living people
Belizean footballers
Belize international footballers
Association football goalkeepers
Belize under-20 international footballers
Belize youth international footballers
Belize Defence Force FC players
Premier League of Belize players
People from Dangriga